The following is a list of fictional characters who appear in the Freeform drama series Good Trouble (2019present).

Overview

Main

Callie Adams Foster
Callie Adams Foster (portrayed by Maia Mitchell; seasons 14), is a recent graduate of UCSD Law School and Mariana's adopted sister.

She leaves to join the ACLU in Washington, D.C. in the second episode of season 4, though she has spoken to Mariana occasionally through web chat.

Mariana Adams Foster
Mariana Adams Foster (portrayed by Cierra Ramirez) is a software engineer and Callie's adopted sister who recently graduated from MIT.

Malika Williams
Malika Williams (portrayed by Zuri Adele) is a bartender and political activist who lives with Callie and Mariana in the Coterie.

Alice Kwan
Alice Kwan (portrayed by Sherry Cola) is the building manager of The Coterie apartment building.

Gael Martinez
Gael Martinez (portrayed by Tommy Martinez) is a bisexual graphic designer and artist who falls for Callie.

Judge Curtis Wilson
Judge Curtis Wilson (portrayed by Roger Bart; seasons 1–2, guest season 3) is a conservative judge for whom Callie worked as a clerk.

Davia Moss
Davia Moss (portrayed by Emma Hunton; season 2–present, recurring season 1) is a body-positive influencer and teacher.

Dennis Cooper
Dennis Cooper (portrayed by Josh Pence; season 2–present, recurring season 1) is the oldest tenant in the Coterie who is an aspiring musician.

Jamie Hunter
Jamie Hunter (portrayed by Beau Mirchoff; seasons 3–4, recurring seasons 1–2) is a lawyer and Callie's on-again-off-again boyfriend.

Joaquin Peréz
Joaquin Peréz (portrayed by Bryan Craig; season 4) is a mysterious new resident to the Coterie and investigative journalist who is looking for his estranged sister Jenna.

Isabella Tavez
Isabella Tavez (portrayed by Priscilla Quintana as Isabella Tavez; season 4, recurring seasons 2–3) is an aspiring actress and model

Recurring

Rebecca
Rebcca (portrayed by Molly McCook; season 1) is a clerk for Judge Wilson.

Benjamin
Benjamin (portrayed by Ken Kirby; seasons 1–2, guest season 3), another clerk for Judge Wilson

Dustin Ingram
Alex Wood (portrayed by Dustin Ingram; seasons 1-2, guest season 3) is Mariana's co-worker at Speckulate.

Raj Patil
Raj Patil (portrayed by Dhruv Uday Singh; seasons 1-3) is Mariana's co-worker at Speckulate and later boyfriend.

Sam Higgins
Sam Higgins (portrayed by Max Cutler; seasons 1-2, guest season 3) is Mariana's co-worker at Speckulate.

Bryan
Bryan (portrayed by Michael Galante; season 1) is an event planner at the Standard Hotel who is gay.

Casey Pierce
Casey Pierce (portrayed by Chloe Wepper; seasons 1-2) is a software engineer at Speckulate.

Angela Miller
Angela Miller (portrayed by Heather Mazur; seasons 1–2) is the head of HR at Speckulate.

Josh Mandela
Josh Mandela (portrayed by Charlie Bodin; season 1) is a sexist.

Sandra Thompson
Sandra Thompson (portrayed by Nicki Micheaux; season 1, guest season 2) is a political activist.

Sumi Liu
Sumi Liu (portrayed by Kara Wang; seasons 1-4) is Alice's ex-girlfriend and now best friend.

Evan Speck
Evan Speck (portrayed by TJ Linnard; seasons 1-4) is Mariana's boss and the CEO of Speckulate.

Meera Mattei
Meera Mattei (portrayed by Briana Venskus); season 1, guest season 2) is Sumi's former fiancée.

Joey Riverton
Joey Riverton (portrayed by Daisy Eagan; seasons 1–2) is Alice's love interest.

Isaac Hall
Isaac Hall (portrayed by Sarunas J. Jackson; seasons 1-3, guest season 4) is a former professional basketball player and Malika's boyfriend.

Dom Williams
Dom Williams (portrayed by J. Mallory McCree; seasons 1-2, guest season 3) is Malika's brother.

Kate Nguyen
Kate Nguyen (portrayed by Dianne Doan; season 1) is a judicial clerk for Judge Wilson.

Jeff Maxwell
Jeff Maxwell (portrayed by Chris Sheffield; season 1, guest season 2) is a businessman. He is the ex-boyfriend of Davia Moss and the estranged husband of Lily.

Kelly Campbell
Kelly Campbell (portrayed by Anastasia Leddick; season 1-4) is a resident at The Coterie and former member of Dennis' improv group.

Rachel Boyle
Rachel Boyle (portrayed by Maisie Klompus; seasons 1-4) is Marianna's friend and business partner for Bulk Beauty.

Claire Badgley
Claire Badgley (portrayed by Seri DeYoung; seasons 1-4) is Marianna's friend and business partner for Bulk Beauty and Raj's new girlfriend.

Gina Spero
Gina Spero (portrayed by Rachel Rosenbloom; seasons 1-4) is Marianna's friend and business partner for Bulk Beauty.

Elijah Andriex
Elijah Adrieux (portrayed by Denim Richards; season 2) is Gael's first love.

Marcus
Marcus (portrayed by Juan Antonio; season 2) is a lawyer at Legal Aid.

Teresa
Teresa (portrayed by Lisandra Tena; season 2) is a lawyer at Legal Aid.

Cary Plack
Cary Plack (portrayed by Amin El Gamal; season 2) is a research assistant at Legal Aid.

Gwen Tuckerman
Gwen Tuckerman (portrayed by Nicole Lynn Evans; season 2), a research assistant at Legal Aid.

Joseph Turner
Joseph Turner (portrayed by Richard Brooks; season 2) is the father of Malika.

Melina Abdullah
Melina Abdullah (portrayed by Herself; season 2) is an actress and Black Lives Matter activist.

Sydney

Sydney (portrayed by Caitlin Kimball; season 2)

Tiana

Tiana (portrayed by Zsane Jhe; season 2)

Lindsay Brady
Lindsay Brady (portrayed by River Butcher; seasons 2-3, guest season 4) is Sumi's love interest.

Patrisse Cullors
Patrisse Cullors as (portrayed by Herself; season 2, guest seasons 1, 3) is a Black Lives Matter activist.

Kendra Zahir
Kendra Zahir (portrayed by Azita Ghanizada; season 2) is the COO of Spekulate.

Lisa
Lisa (portrayed by Shawntay Dalton; season 2) is a single mother

Sariya

Sariya (portrayed by Presliah Nunez; season 2)

Hugo Martinez
Hugo Martinez (portrayed by Alex Fernandez; season 2) is the father of Gael.

Kathleen Gale
Kathleen Gale (portrayed by Constance Zimmer; season 3, guest season 4) is an intimidating defense attorney who becomes Callie's boss and mentor while being investigated by the FBI for her connection with Albert Chen.

Tony Britton
Tony Britton (portrayed by Jason Blair; season 3) is a charismatic lawyer who works for Kathleen

Dyonter
Dyonte (portrayed by Marcus Emanuel Mitchell; seasons 3-4) is a fellow intern at the non-profit that Malika works at.

Andre Johnson
Andre Johnson (portrayed by Terrel Ransom Jr.; season 3, guest seasons 2, 4) is a student that attends Diane Hash Elementary.

Yuri Elwin
Yuri Elwin (portrayed by Craig Parker; seasons 3-4) is a high-profile artist.

Matt
Matt (portrayed by Erik Stocklin; season 3, guest season 4) is a fellow teacher and friend of Davia.

Scott Farrell

Scott Farrell (portrayed by Stephen Guarino; season 3)

Ruby Chen
Ruby (portrayed by Shannon Chan-Kent; season 3) is a lesbian who works for BTV as a scout.

Jordan

Jordan (portrayed by Aisha Alfa; season 3)

Marc Rothman

Marc Rothman (portrayed by Chris L. McKenna; season 3)

Magda

Magda (portrayed by Marissa Rivera; season 3, guest season 4)

Derek

Derek (portrayed by Nabeel Muscatwalla; season 3, guest season 4)

Sanjana

Sanjana (portrayed by Zainne Seleh; season 3)

Stacey

Stacey (portrayed by Nicole Dele; season 3)

Shaun

Shaun (portrayed by Kyle Tamm; season 3)

Nicolette Baptiste
Nicolette Baptiste (portrayed by Catherine Haena Kim; season 3) is a kind yet fierce attorney that becomes Callie's rival

Martin Gutierrez

Martin Gutierrez (Mark Adair-Rios; season 3)

DPN Manager
The DPN Manager (portrayed by Dinora Walcott; season 3) is the unnamed manager of DPN.

Ken Sung
Ken Sung (portrayed by Stephen Oyoung; season 3, guest season 4) is Kathleen's client.

Julia Sung
Julia Sung (portrayed by Jennifer Jalene; season 3, guest season 4) is Ken's wife.

Tommy Sung
Tommy Sung (Kevin David; season 3, guest season 4), Ken and Julia's son who is on trial for the murder of his best friend.

Katie Parker

Katie Parker (portrayed by Peyton Woolf; season 3)

Dan Soloman

Dan Soloman (portrayed by Tim Martin Gleason; season 3)

Rowan Albarran
Rowan Albarran (portrayed by Emmett Preciado; season 3, guest season 4) is a lawyer who works for Kathleen Gale.

Jackie Morton

Jackie Morton (portrayed by Tiffany Dupont; season 3, guest season 4)

Angelica
Angelica (portrayed by Odelya Halevi; season 3) and Yasmine Aker (season 4) is a queer waitress at Duoro.

Tanya
Tanya (portrayed by Liisi LaFontaine; season 3) is the girlfriend of Dyone Davis.

Liza Davis
Liza Davis (portrayed by Nicole Maines; season 4), the project supervisor at Revitalize Beauty.

Luca
Luca (portrayed by Booboo Stewart; season 4) is a homeless man whom Joaquin interviews for a story and is befriended by The Coterie inhabitants.

Lucia Morales
Lucia Morales (portrayed by Malaya Rivera Drew; season 4, guest season 3) is a city councilwoman who Malika works for.

Will

Will (portrayed by Izzy Diaz; season 4)

Tracy

Tracy (portrayed by Marisela Zumbado; season 4)

Jenna Peréz
Jenna Peréz (portrayed by Maiara Walsh; season 4) is the estranged sister of Joaquin.

Ryan Jones

Ryan Jones (portrayed by Brooke Nevin; season 4)

Asher Bowen

Asher Bowen (portrayed by Michael Cassidy; season 4)

Elliot Bowen

Elliot Bowen (portrayed by Jesse Berry; season 4)

Silas Thompson
Born Gary Brecker, Silas Thompson (portrayed by Graham Sibley; season 4) is a man who was arrested for filing fake health insurance claims. After serving time, he has become a cult leader who Jenna has fallen in with while using a farm as a front for his activities.

Notable guest stars
 Hailie Sahar as Jazmin Martinez (seasons 1-4), Gael's sister
 Robert Gant as Jim Hunter (seasons 2-3), Jamie and Eliza’s father and Brandon’s father in-law
 Susan Walters as Diane Hunter (seasons 2-3), Jamie and Eliza's mother and Brandon's mother in-law
 Megan West as Eliza Foster (seasons 2-3), Brandon's wife and Jamie's sister
 Margaret Cho as Herself (season 3)
 Philip Anthony-Rodriguez as Marc Tavez (season 4), the father of Isabella

Reprised roles from The Fosters
The following reprised their roles from The Fosters:

 Hayden Byerly as Jude Adams Foster (special guest seasons 1-4), Callie's half-brother and the youngest adopted sibling of Mariana
 Teri Polo as Stef Adams Foster (special guest seasons 1-5), the adoptive mother of Callie and Mariana
 Sherri Saum as Lena Adams Foster (special guest seasons 1-5), the adoptive mother of Callie and Mariana
 Noah Centineo as Jesus Adams Foster (special guest seasons 1-2), Mariana's twin brother and adopted brother of Callie 
 David Lambert as Brandon Foster (special guest seasons 1-3), the adoptive sibling of Mariana and Callie
 Amanda Leighton as Emma Kurtzman, Jesus' fiance (guest season 2)
 Gavin MacIntosh as Connor Stevens (guest season 3), Jude's childhood boyfriend

References

Good Trouble